Senator Hennigan may refer to:

Gilbert Franklin Hennigan (1883–1960), Louisiana State Senate
James W. Hennigan Jr. (1927–2020), Massachusetts State Senate